The 1953 Walker Cup, the 14th Walker Cup Match, was played on September 4 and 5, 1953, at the Kittansett Club, Marion, Massachusetts. The United States won by 9 matches to 3.

Format
Four 36-hole matches of foursomes were played on Friday and eight singles matches on Saturday. Each of the 12 matches was worth one point in the larger team competition. If a match was all square after the 36th hole extra holes were not played. The team with most points won the competition. If the two teams were tied, the previous winner would retain the trophy.

Teams
Ten players for the United States and Great Britain & Ireland participated in the event. Great Britain & Ireland had a playing captain, while the United States had a non-playing captain. Tony Duncan, the Great Britain and Ireland playing captain, did not select himself for any of the matches.

United States

Captain: Charlie Yates
William C. Campbell
Dick Chapman
Don Cherry
Charles Coe
Jimmy Jackson
Gene Littler
Sam Urzetta
Ken Venturi
Harvie Ward
Jack Westland

Great Britain & Ireland
 & 
Playing captain:  Tony Duncan
 Joe Carr
 Norman Drew
 John Langley
 Roy MacGregor
 Gerald Micklem
 John Llewellyn Morgan
 Arthur Perowne
 Ronnie White
 James Wilson

Friday's foursomes

Saturday's singles

References

Walker Cup
Golf in Massachusetts
Sports competitions in Massachusetts
Sports in Plymouth County, Massachusetts
Marion, Massachusetts
Walker Cup
Walker Cup
Walker Cup
Walker Cup